Rhesa Hawkins Barksdale (born August 8, 1944) is a Senior United States circuit judge of the United States Court of Appeals for the Fifth Circuit.

Early life, education and legal training

Born in Jackson, Mississippi, Barksdale received a Bachelor of Science degree from United States Military Academy at West Point in 1966. He was in the United States Army from 1966 to 1970, serving in the Vietnam War, and afterwards returned to studies. In 1972, he received a Juris Doctor from the University of Mississippi Law School, where he graduated first in his class and was a member of the Mississippi Mayes Inn of the Phi Delta Phi legal fraternity. He was a law clerk for Justice Byron White of the United States Supreme Court from 1972 to 1973.

Career 

Barksdale entered the private practice of law, as an attorney for the firm of Butler, Snow, O'Mara, Stevens and Cannada in Jackson from 1973 to 1990. During this time, he was an instructor in constitutional law for the University of Mississippi Law School Paralegal Course in 1975 and 1976, and an instructor in the Mississippi College School of Law in 1976. He was a Chairman, Mississippi Vietnam Veterans Leadership Program from 1982 to 1985.

Federal judicial service

On November 17, 1989, President George H. W. Bush nominated Barksdale to a seat on the United States Court of Appeals for the Fifth Circuit vacated by Judge Alvin Benjamin Rubin. Barksdale was confirmed by the United States Senate on March 9, 1990, and received his commission on March 12, 1990. Barksdale took senior status on August 8, 2009.

Personal 

A resident of Jackson, Mississippi, Barksdale is the brother of former Netscape Communications Corporation CEO Jim Barksdale.

See also 
List of law clerks of the Supreme Court of the United States (Seat 6)

Notes

References 
  

1944 births
20th-century American judges
Judges of the United States Court of Appeals for the Fifth Circuit
Law clerks of the Supreme Court of the United States
Living people
Mississippi College School of Law faculty
United States court of appeals judges appointed by George H. W. Bush
United States Military Academy alumni
University of Mississippi School of Law alumni